This is a list of the Honduras national football team results from 1920 to 1959.

1921
Honduras made its debut in the Independence Centenary Games held in Guatemala City in September 1921, losing 10–1 to Guatemala.  There were other sources that published a final score of 9–0.

1930

1935

1946

1950

1953

1955

1957

1959

Record

References

1920-1959